This is a list of French television related events from 1958.

Events
12 March - France wins the 3rd Eurovision Song Contest in Hilversum, Netherlands. The winning song is "Dors, mon amour" performed by André Claveau. The year marks the first time the contest was won by the male solo singer.

Debuts

Television shows

1940s
Le Jour du Seigneur (1949-present)

1950s
A la découverte des Français
Le Club du jeudi (1950-1961)
Magazine féminin (1952-1970)
Lectures pour tous (1953-1968)
La Boîte à sel (1955-1960)
La Piste aux étoiles (1956-1978)
Voyage sans passeport (1957-1969)

Ending this year

Births
23 January - Christophe Dechavanne, TV personality

Deaths

See also
1958 in France
List of French films of 1958